The Church of Saint Julia is a Roman Catholic place of worship located in the city of Turin, Italy.

History 

The church was built in 1862 under the patronage of philanthropist Juliette Colbert de Barolo, who donated 500'000 Italian lira for its construction. Architect Alessandro Antonelli was initially interested in designing the church, and wished for it to be dedicated to Luke the Evangelist, but Colbert stated that she would not go through with her donation unless the church were to be designed by Giovanni Battista Ferrante and dedicated to Saint Julia of Corsica.

The building was damaged by Allied bombardments during World War II, in 1943.

References 

Roman Catholic churches completed in 1866
Roman Catholic churches in Turin
19th-century Roman Catholic church buildings in Italy